Federal Highway 43 (Carretera Federal 43) (Fed. 43) is a free (libre) part of the federal highways corridors (los corredores carreteros federales) of Mexico.

Fed. 43 connects the city of Salamanca, Guanajuato in the north to the capital of Michoacán, Morelia in the south. Near Morelia it begins as a highway to cross the bridge over Lake Cuitzeo, just north of the intersection of Fed. 15. From there it is a narrow road and is 2 lanes wide in places. The highway connects the cities of Cuitzeo, Moroleón, Uriangato and Valle de Santiago. A motorway fee is now charged.

References

043